The following is an incomplete list of association football clubs based in Tunisia.
For a complete list see :Category:Football clubs in Tunisia

A
AS Ariana
AS Djerba
AS Gabès
AS Kasserine
AS La Marsa
AS Rejiche
AS Soliman

B
ES Beni-Khalled

C
CA Bizertin
Club Africain
CO Transports
CS Chebba
CS Hammam-Lif
CS Korba
CS M'saken
CS Makthar
CS Sfaxien

E
El Ahly Mateur
El Makarem de Mahdia
EGS Gafsa
Enfida Sports
EO Sidi Bouzid
ES Hammam-Sousse
ES Metlaoui
ES Radès
ES Tunis
ES Zarzis
ES Jerba
EO La Goulette et Kram
ES Sahel

F
FC Hammamet

G
Grombalia Sports

J
Jendouba Sport
JS Kairouan

L
LPST Tozeur

M
CO Médenine

O
Océano Club de Kerkennah
Olympique Béja
Olympique du Kef

S
SC Moknine
Sfax Railways Sports
Stade Africain Menzel Bourguiba
Stade Gabèsien
Stade Sportif Sfaxien
Stade Tunisien
Stir Sportive Zarzouna

U
US Sbeitla
US Ben Guerdane
US Monastir
US Tataouine

Women's football clubs 

 AS Banque de l'Habitat

 
Tunisia
Football
Football clubs